Down a Dark Stairwell  is a 2020 documentary about the 2014 shooting of Akai Gurley in New York City produced by the film production company Noncompliant Films. The documentary made its debut broadcast on the PBS series Independent Lens on April 12, 2021. It was later broadcast on the Criterion Channel and distributed by Kino Lorber on their streaming platform  and Kanopy.

Synopsis 
In 2014, Akai Gurley was walking with his friend in a dark stairwell of a public housing project when he was shot by NYPD officer Peter Liang. The film covers the events after the shooting and follows a multi-cultural coalition of protesters who support the conviction of Liang. In contrast, the film also follows Asian-American community protesters that argue Liang was used as a scapegoat.

Awards 

 Les Blank Award, Best Documentary Feature, Ashland Independent Festival 2020
 Special Jury Recognition, Documentary Feature Editing, Ashland Independent Festival 2020
 Best of Documentary, Indy Film Festival
 Best Documentary Award, Truth to Power, Toronto Reel Asian International Film Festival
 Grand Jury Award, Best Documentary Feature, Los Angeles Asian Pacific Film Festival
 Audience Award, San Diego Asian Film Festival

References 

2020 documentary films
American documentary films
2020 films
2020s American films